The electricity use in Portugal (gross production + imports – exports – losses) was 51.2 TWh in 2008. Portugal imported 9 TWh electricity in 2008. Population was 10.6 million. In 2018 electricity was generated by 23% hydroelectricity, 26% natural gas, 22% wind, 20% coal, 5% biomass, 2% solar and 2% oil. In 2019 electricity was generated by 19% hydroelectricity, 32% natural gas, 26% wind, 10% coal, 6% biomass, 2% solar, 2% oil and 1% other combustibles.

Main power stations

Hydro

The pumped-storage hydroelectricity plant at Frades works as 880 MW for generation and 780 MW for pumping.

Wind power 

Portugal produced 20% of electricity with wind power in 2017 and had the average year capacity of 14% of wind power in the end 2010. Wind power capacity was 3,357 MW in end 2009 and 3,702 MW in end 2010.

Solar power 

In Lisbon, the energy  payback time (see also EROEI) in the roof top solar photovoltaic (PV) technology is less than 2 years and less than in Sydney, Munich, Athens or Barcelona, but some more than in Madrid, Los Angeles or Ankara.

Transmission 

Redes Energéticas Nacionais manages the high voltage power lines.

In 2014, Portugal had an electricity interconnection level (international transmission capacity relative to production capacity) of 7%, below the recommended 10% level.

References

Electric power in Portugal